Virginia Lee (1901–1996) was an American film actress of the silent era.

Selected filmography
 The Terror (1917)
 The Gulf Between (1917)
 Beyond the Law (1918)
 The Whirlpool (1918)
 Oh, Johnny! (1918)
 Luck and Pluck (1919)
 Sandy Burke of the U-Bar-U (1919)
 The Servant Question (1920)
 A Daughter of Two Worlds (1920)
 The Fortune Teller (1920)
 For Love or Money (1920)
 Scrambled Wives (1921)
 If Women Only Knew (1921)
 The White Masks (1921)
 Beyond the Rainbow (1922)
 Destiny's Isle (1922)
 If Winter Comes (1923)
 The Adorable Cheat (1928)
 Fatal Lady (1936)

References

Bibliography
 Katchmer, George A. A Biographical Dictionary of Silent Film Western Actors and Actresses. McFarland, 2015.

External links

American film actresses
1901 births
1996 deaths
Actresses from Mexico City
20th-century American actresses
American silent film actresses